This is a list of Danish television related events from 1994.

Events

Debuts

Television shows

Births
8 August - Mathias Käki Jørgensen, actor

Deaths

See also
1994 in Denmark